Jesús Toscanini (born December 11, 1987 in Rocha) is a Uruguayan professional footballer.

Teams
  Rocha 2004–2007
  Miramar Misiones 2007–2008
  Everton 2008
  Tacuarembó 2009
  Montevideo Wanderers F.C. 2009–2010
  Jorge Wilstermann 2011
  Sud América 2011–2012
  Torque 2012–2013
  Juventud Independiente 2013–2014
  Alianza 2014
  Atlético Huila 2015
  Rampla Juniors 2016
  Municipal Limeño 2016–2017

References

External links
Profile at theplayersagent Profile at

1987 births
Living people
Uruguayan footballers
Uruguayan expatriate footballers
Rocha F.C. players
Tacuarembó F.C. players
Miramar Misiones players
Everton de Viña del Mar footballers
Montevideo Wanderers F.C. players
C.D. Jorge Wilstermann players
Sud América players
Montevideo City Torque players
Expatriate footballers in Chile
Expatriate footballers in Bolivia
Association football forwards
C.D. Juventud Independiente players
Alianza F.C. footballers
Atlético Huila footballers
Rampla Juniors players
Oulun Palloseura players
Expatriate footballers in El Salvador
Expatriate footballers in Colombia
Expatriate footballers in Finland